John George Roman (born August 31, 1952) is a former professional American football offensive lineman in the National Football League. He played seven seasons for the New York Jets (1976–1982).

References

1952 births
Living people
People from Ventnor City, New Jersey
Players of American football from New Jersey
American football offensive linemen
Idaho State Bengals football players
New York Jets players